Robertsbridge railway station is on the Hastings line in the south of England and serves the village of Robertsbridge, East Sussex. It is  down the line from London Charing Cross. The station and all trains serving it are operated by Southeastern.

History 

Robertsbridge was temporarily the terminus of the South Eastern Railway's (SER) "Hastings Line" from Tunbridge Wells. This section was opened on 1 September 1851, with the 5.99 mile (9.64 km) stretch to Battle following four months later. A connection was then made with the existing route to Hastings on 1 February 1852; the line connecting  with Hastings having been opened by the SER on 13 February 1851, and which initially gave the Brighton, Lewes and Hastings Railway access to the latter town. A large station building was provided on the Down side, along with a signal box at the south end of the Down platform.

Robertsbridge became a junction in 1900 with the opening of the Rother Valley Light Railway to Tenterden. The line was extended to Headcorn in 1905, and was renamed the Kent and East Sussex Railway. In 1954 all regular passenger services were withdrawn and the line beyond Tenterden Town was completely closed. The line to Tenterden continued to be used by freight services and occasional special passenger trains (e.g. hop pickers trains) until closed by British Railways on 12 June 1961. About half a mile length of line remained in use as a siding to serve Hodsons Mill on the outskirts of Robertsbridge until 1970.The bay platform, on the Down (eastern) side of the station, is still in place and used for engineers trains. A railway preservation society, the Rother Valley Railway, have built a new separate station named  on the east side of the car park, and have rebuilt the line from here to Northbridge Street. The first train on this rebuilt section ran in September 2013. They have plans to rebuild the rest of the route eastwards to join up with the Kent and East Sussex Railway and restore services along the line. (Steam trains already run on another section of the line, between Tenterden Town and Bodiam, 3½ miles from Robertsbridge.)

Services 
All services at Robertsbridge are operated by Southeastern using  EMUs.

The typical off-peak service in trains per hour is:
 1 tph to London Charing Cross via 
 1 tph to 

During the peak hours, the station is served by additional services between London Charing Cross and Hastings, increasing the service to 2 tph in each direction.

References

External links 

Railway stations in East Sussex
Former South Eastern Railway (UK) stations
DfT Category E stations
Railway stations in Great Britain opened in 1851
Railway stations served by Southeastern
1851 establishments in England
railway station